Limbert is both a surname and a given name. Notable people with the surname include:

Surname:
Charles Limbert designer and founder of the Limbert Furniture Company.
John Limbert, American diplomat
Marc Limbert (born 1973), Welsh football midfielder
Paul Moyer Limbert (1897-1998), American Secretary General of the World Alliance of YMCA

Given name:
Limbert Méndez (born 1982), Bolivian football defender
Límbert Pizarro (born 1976), Bolivian football midfielder